Amalia Bereș (born 18 June 1997) is a Romanian rower. She competed in the women's eight event at the 2020 Summer Olympics.

References

External links

1997 births
Living people
Romanian female rowers
Olympic rowers of Romania
Rowers at the 2020 Summer Olympics
Place of birth missing (living people)
20th-century Romanian women
21st-century Romanian women
World Rowing Championships medalists for Romania